Jack, Knave and Fool is the fifth historical mystery novel about Sir John Fielding by Bruce Alexander.

Plot summary
Sir John treats his household to a performance of Händel's music, but murder introduces a discordant note.  Meanwhile, a runaway reprobate and a bodiless head present other problems to the magistrate.

1998 American novels
Sir John Fielding series
American historical novels
Novels set in England
G. P. Putnam's Sons books